Edgar Gerhard Julius Oscar Ludwig von Westphalen (26 March 1819 – 30 September 1890) was a German writer, Communist politician and long time friend and the brother-in-law of Karl Marx. He was the son of Prussian baron Ludwig von Westphalen and his second wife Caroline Heubel. Heubel was also the mother of Jenny who married Karl Marx. Edgar had a half-brother Ferdinand from his father's first marriage. The Westphalen and Marx families were neighbors in Trier, with Karl and Edgar being friends and schoolmates.

During the Adelsverein sponsored German immigration to Texas, Edgar von Westphalen was one of the early immigrants to the Latin settlement of Sisterdale.

Westphalen was an early member of the Communist Correspondence Committee's Brussels' circle and later one of the founding members of the Communist League.

Works 
 Aus Havelland. Gedichte. Gensch, Berlin 1883.
 Armin, der Cheruskerfürst. Gensch, Berlin 1883.
 Der Bataveraufstand. Gensch, Berlin 1883.
 Aus Havelland. Gedichte. 2. Auflage. Gensch, Berlin 1884.

References

1819 births
1890 deaths
German emigrants to the Republic of Texas
German emigrants to the United States
German-American culture in Texas
German-American history
People from the Grand Duchy of the Lower Rhine